Pater Damiaan terug is a 1936 silent documentary short directed by Clemens De Landtsheer. It deals with the return of the last remains of Belgian priest Father Damien from Molokai to his birthplace in Belgium.

Sources

External links 

 

Belgian documentary films
1936 films
Belgian black-and-white films
Silent films
Documentary films about death
Documentary films about Catholicism
Cultural depictions of Father Damien
1936 documentary films
1930s Dutch-language films
Dutch-language Belgian films